The Palace Hotel is one of a group of heritage hotels on Hannan Street in Kalgoorlie, Western Australia.

Location
The hotel is located on the corner of Hannan and Maritana Streets.

It is across the road from the Exchange Hotel, another heritage hotel.

History
The hotel was constructed with ashlar stones in 1897 for Harry Rosenthal, who previously managed the Cleopatra Hotel in Fremantle. It cost £17,000 to build.

The hotel opened in December 1897, with forty-four bedrooms. It was designed in the Federation architectural style by the firm Porter & Thomas, and meant to be the most luxurious hotel in Western Australia outside Perth. The furniture came from Melbourne. It became the first hotel in Kalgoorlie to have electric lighting, with its own generator, and fresh water in all bathrooms coming directly from its own condensers.

In the year after its completion regular and repeated newspaper articles and photographs were used to praise the hotel and its presentation.

A 1904 fire damaged the hotel and adjacent property.

In 1936 renovations were reported on the Hannan Street side of the building.

Herbert Hoover association
Herbert Hoover (later the US president from 1929 to 1933) visited the hotel regularly when he was working as a mining engineer in Kalgoorlie. He was twenty-two at the time. During his stay, he reportedly fell in love with a barmaid, and wrote her a poem. An excerpt from the poem can be seen in the foyer. It reads:

Before he left for China, Hoover left a mirror as a gift to the hotel. The Hoover Mirror can still be seen in the foyer, next to his poem. Hoover's Cafe and Lounge Bar in the hotel is also named in his honour.

Later history
The 60th anniversary of the hotel was celebrated with style in 1957.

The hotel has been regularly associated with the Diggers & Dealers conferences.

Reference point
The hotel and its location on the corner of Hannan Street has been captured in photographs of Hannan Street over time as well as at significant historical events.

Heritage value
The hotel has been listed on the State Heritage Register since 1997.

References

1897 establishments in Australia
Hotel buildings completed in 1897
Hotels established in 1897
Heritage places in Kalgoorlie, Western Australia
Heritage hotels in Australia
Federation style architecture
Herbert Hoover
Hotels in Kalgoorlie-Boulder
Hannan Street, Kalgoorlie